The 2015 Tour de San Luis was the 9th edition of the Tour de San Luis stage race. It was part of the 2015 UCI America Tour, and took place in Argentina between 18 and 25 January 2015. The race was won by Daniel Díaz of the  squad, which displayed a dominant performance by winning stages 2, 4 and 6, all of the top mountain finish stages. Another notable performance came from Fernando Gaviria, who won two sprint stages ahead of former world champion Mark Cavendish.

Teams 
26 teams were selected to take part in the event. This included six UCI World Tour teams.

 
 
 
 
 
 
 
 
 Argentina
 
 
 
 
 
 
 
 
 
 
 
 Italy
 Colombia (national team)
 Cuba
 Chile
 Panama

Schedule

The race included seven stages, one of which was a summit finish, one an individual time trial and the others medium mountain stages.

Stages

Stage 1
19 January 2015 — San Luis to Villa Mercedes,

Stage 2

Stage 3

Stage 4
22 January 2015 — Villa Dolores to Alto El Amago,

Stage 5
23 January 2015 — San Luis to San Luis, individual time trial (ITT)

Stage 6
24 January 2015 — Achiras to Merlo–Filo Sierras Comechingones,

Stage 7
25 January 2015 — San Luis to San Luis,

Classification leadership table
In the 2015 Tour de San Luis, four different jerseys were awarded. For the general classification, calculated by adding each cyclist's finishing times on each stage, the leader received an orange jersey. This classification was considered the most important of the 2015 Tour de San Luis, and the winner of the classification was considered the winner of the race. Additionally, there was a sprints classification, which awarded a green jersey. In the sprints classification, cyclists received points for finishing in the top 3 at intermediate sprint points during each stage, on a 3–2–1 scale.

There was also a mountains classification, the leadership of which was marked by a red jersey. In the mountains classification, points were won by reaching the top of a climb before other cyclists. Each climb was categorised as either first or third-category, with more points available for the higher-categorised climbs. For first-category climbs, points were awarded on a scale of 10 points for first across the climb, second place earned 8 points, third 6, fourth 4, fifth 2 and sixth 1. Third-category climbs awarded points to the top three riders only; 3 points for first across the climb, second place earned 2 points, third place earned 1 point.

The fourth jersey represented the young rider classification, marked by a white jersey. This was decided the same way as the general classification, but only riders born after 1 January 1993 were eligible to be ranked in the classification. Lastly, there was a classification for teams, in which the times of the best three cyclists per team on each stage were added together; the leading team at the end of the race was the team with the lowest total time.

References

External links

Tour de San Luis
San Luis
Tour de San Luis
January 2015 sports events in South America